James William McCutcheon (May 23, 1924 – January 9, 2002) was an American character actor known for his roles in film, television, and theatre, several of which won him Emmy and Tony awards.

Early life
McCutcheon was born in Russell, Kentucky, the son of  Robert Kenna McCutcheon, who was a railroad conductor and Florence Louise (née Elam). McCutcheon's first major role was Leo the Leprechaun on The Howdy Doody Show. He followed this appearance with a recurring role (from 1984 to 1992) as Uncle Wally on the children's television series by PBS, Sesame Street, for which he won an Emmy.

He also had a prominent role in the movie of 1989, Steel Magnolias, in which he played Owen Jenkins, beau of Ouiser Boudreaux (Shirley MacLaine).

Career
He was also active in film and on the stage. His first film appearance was in 1964's Santa Claus Conquers the Martians; later on, he was seen in movies including Family Business and Steel Magnolias. McCutcheon was a familiar face to young audience in the 1960s, when he appeared on several Tootsie Roll television commercials. His theatre credits include a role as Moonface Martin in Anything Goes, which won him a Tony Award for Best Featured Actor in a Musical.

Other stage appearances include You Can't Take It with You and The Man Who Came to Dinner.

Death
A resident of Mahwah, New Jersey, McCutcheon died on January 9, 2002, of natural causes, aged 77. He had three children, Carol, Jay, and Kenna.

Filmography

References

External links
 
 
 
 

1924 births
2002 deaths
American male film actors
American male musical theatre actors
American male television actors
Male actors from Kentucky
People from Greenup County, Kentucky
People from Mahwah, New Jersey
Tony Award winners
20th-century American singers
20th-century American male actors
20th-century American male singers